Ericka Rere (née Ratu, born 8 February 1963) is a former New Zealand rugby union player. She made her debut for New Zealand at RugbyFest 1990 against the Netherlands at Ashburton. She was selected for the 1991 Women's Rugby World Cup squad and started in all the games.

References 

1963 births
Living people
New Zealand women's international rugby union players
New Zealand female rugby union players
Rugby union players from the Bay of Plenty Region